Mahawilachchiya Divisional Secretariat is a  Divisional Secretariat  of Anuradhapura District, of North Central Province, Sri Lanka. There are 14 public schools in the division.

There are 16 public schools in Mahawilachchiya DS Division. They are, 
 Thakshila Maha Vidyalaya - Bogas Handiya
 Gamini Vidyalaya - Tract 3
 Sri Wimalagnana Maha Vidyalaya - Thanthirimale
 Billewa Vidyalaya
 Ananda Vidayalaya
 Dharmapala Maha Vidyalaya - Thambiyawa 
 Maha Kashyapa Vidyalaya
 Rahula Vidyalaya - Ethdathkalla
 Sirisangabo Vidyalaya - Wanni Helambewa
 Ashoka Vidyalaya - Siyambalagaswewa 
 Saliyamala Maha Vidyalaya - Tract 7
 Siddhartha Maha Vidyalaya - Pemaduwa
 Seevali Primary Model School - Pemaduwa
 Dunumandalawa Vidyalaya - Dunumandalawa 
 Ashokamala Vidyalaya - Kadurupitiya

References
 Divisional Secretariats Portal

Divisional Secretariats of Anuradhapura District